Wyee Point is a far southern suburb of the City of Lake Macquarie in New South Wales, Australia, on the southern shoreline of Lake Macquarie.

History 
The Awabakal are the traditional people of this area.

References

External links
 History of Wyee Point (Lake Macquarie City Library)

Suburbs of Lake Macquarie